The Classical Lyceum Anavryton (official name "Ethnikon Ekpaideftirio Anavryton", but commonly known as Anavryta) was an elite Greek lyceum (originally a boarding school only for boys) that was established shortly before the beginning of the World War II in 1940, in order to provide education to the members of the Greek royal family and notable Athenian families and reestablished after the war in 1949. Since that year the school was named a "Lyceum Aristouhon" which only admitted students who distinguished themselves in other schools. After several educational reforms in Greece the school lost its elitistic character in 1976, but continued to have higher admissions standards until the end of the 80's. Nowadays, admission is dependent on passing a written test.

Anavryta was originally  based on the educational principles of Kurt Hahn, and modelled on Hahn’s own creations the Schule Schloss Salem and Gordonstoun. The effort to create an elite high school in Athens inspired by Hahn’s principles had originated from King George II of Greece following the tradition of the Greek royal family, members of which had attended Hahn schools. The effort was supported by the Greek academic society mainly because of the strong relationship of Hahn’s theories with ancient Greek philosophy. The main goal of the Lyceum was to focus on the pursuit of the Hahnian ideals and the study of Greek classics. 

The school complex is located in the area of Maroussi, near Athens, in the middle of the pine forest of Anavryta, formerly the estate of banking magnate Andreas Syngros. 

The fate of the Lyceum was closely tied with the Greek royal family but the only king of Greece who actually graduated from the Lyceum was Constantine II of Greece, in the class of 1955. After the support of Constantine to the military junta in the early months of 1967 and with the public strongly opposing monarchy, a referendum vote established the system of presidential democracy and denounced the king in 1974. (In an extraordinary turn of events, the graduate society of Anavryta chose not to support the king, an event that had an effect on the vote.)

Under circumstances that followed in the next years and especially in the 1980s it was increasingly difficult for a public school to maintain an elitist approach in Greece. Anavryta lost its exclusive character, but remained a school with a solid reputation for academic excellence. Eventually at the end of 1991–1992 the school was prohibited from setting absolutely any kind of admission standards and requirements. Thus the Lyceum had completely lost its original characteristics.

The Anavryta experiment initially ended mainly because of the hostility that the democratic Greek governments have shown to what was considered to be the reminder of the previous regime and the complete transformation of Greek society in the decades that followed. Nevertheless, the importance of the Lyceum and its educational role should not be underestimated. The impressive alumni of the Classical Lyceum shows distinguished members since generations of spiritual leaders, academics, spokesmen, businessmen, and other prominent members of the Greek society had graduated from the Classical Lyceum in the decades following 1940 (http://www.anavryta.org/).

However, in recent years the Anavryta experiment has been reinstated and the selective admission approach restored in 2013, when the Greek Government made it mandatory for students to pass written examinations. The students who performed best in this exam were selected to attend the school.

The school still exists but has been renamed. The Model Lyceum of Anavryta  is a public and model school on the site of the former Classical Lyceum. The school estate and facilities are now devastated and in a state of complete decay, since the buildings received almost no attention for thirty years. Most of the original buildings have been closed and the school facilities, although in ideal surroundings, have been found under a recent research to be the worst in Northern Athens. Restorations have started in 2008 in the Sygros Mansion, and the Anavryta Experimental Gymnasium has already been restored successfully, something that implies that the school may be restored in the following years. Students have expressed their disapproval of the building for years, and the administration of the building is aware of the problem.

Sources 

City of Maroussi (Greek)
Model Lyceum of Anavryta (Greek)
 http://www.anavryta.org/

Educational institutions established in 1940
Schools in Attica
Buildings and structures in North Athens
Marousi
1940 establishments in Greece